Syktyvkar Southwest is an unfinished and abandoned airport in Komi, Russia located 19 km southwest of Syktyvkar. It was intended to be a civilian airport and was partially constructed in the 1980s, but with the collapse of the Soviet Union and the resulting drop in air passenger traffic, the plans to complete it were dropped. Today, the existing Syktyvkar Airport within city limits continues to serve as the city's air transport gateway.

References
RussianAirFields.com

Airports built in the Soviet Union
Airports in the Komi Republic
Syktyvkar